Penicillium amaliae is a fungus species of the genus of Penicillium. Penicillium amaliae is named after Catharina-Amalia Beatrix Carmen Victoria.

See also
List of Penicillium species

References

Further reading
 

amaliae
Fungi described in 2013